The 2021–22 season was the 37th season in the existence of Burgos CF and the club's first season back in the second division of Spanish football since 2002. In addition to the domestic league, Burgos participated in this season's edition of the Copa del Rey.

Players

First-team squad

Reserve team

Transfers

In

Out

Pre-season and friendlies

Competitions

Overall record

Segunda División

League table

Results summary

Results by round

Matches
The league fixtures were announced on 30 June 2021.

Copa del Rey

References

Burgos CF
Burgos